The 2014–15 Bikarkeppni kvenna, named Powerade-bikarinn for sponsorship reasons, was the 41st edition of the Icelandic Women's Basketball Cup, won by Grindavík against Keflavík. The competition was managed by the Icelandic Basketball Federation and the final was held in the Laugardalshöll in Reykjavík on 21 February 2015. Petrúnella Skúladóttir was named the Cup Finals MVP after posting 17 points, 10 rebounds and 5 steals in the win.

Kristen McCarthy of Snæfell led all scorers in the Cup with 78 points in 3 games.

Participating teams
Sixteen teams signed up for the Cup tournament.

Bracket

Cup Finals MVP

References

External links
2014–2015 Tournament results

Women's Cup